Tuoyo Anthony Egodo (born ) is an English professional rugby league footballer who plays as a er or  for the London Broncos in the Betfred Championship.

Egodo has previously been in systems of the Broncos, spending time on loan away from the capital with the Hemel Stags in 2016. A 2017 move to the Castleford Tigers saw his Super League debut, but also loan spells from Castleford to Oldham, York City Knights, Newcastle Thunder and the Bradford Bulls.

Background
Egodo was born in London, England, and is of Nigerian descent.

London Broncos
Egodo has come through the Academy system at the London Broncos. 

He spent time on loan away from the capital in RFL League 1 with the Hemel Stags in 2016.

Castleford Tigers
A 2017 move to the Castleford Tigers saw him stepping up to the Super League. He scored a hat-trick on his Super League debut against Hull FC in September 2017.

In 2017 Egodo was loaned from Castleford to Oldham and the York City Knights.

In 2018 the Tigers sent him on loan to the Newcastle Thunder and the Bradford Bulls.

Return to the Broncos
Egodo returned to the capital ahead of the 2020 Championship season. He was the top try scorer for the Broncos in the 2020 that was curtailed due to a global pandemic.

Club statistics

References

External links
London Broncos profile
Castleford Tigers profile
SL profile
Moseley Rugby profile

1997 births
Living people
Bradford Bulls players
Castleford Tigers players
English sportspeople of Nigerian descent
English rugby league players
English rugby union players
Hemel Stags players
London Broncos players
Moseley Rugby Football Club players
Newcastle Thunder players
Oldham R.L.F.C. players
Rugby league players from London
Rugby league wingers
Rugby union players from London
York City Knights players